Roberto "Pippo" Filippi (born 30 July 1948), also known as Pippo Filippi, is an Italian former professional footballer and manager who played as a midfielder.

Roberto Filippi was the second player to win the Guerin d'Oro two times in a row (1978 and 1979), awarded to the player with the highest average rating in a single Serie A season.

Playing career

Club
Roberto Filippi played in Serie A with Bologna, Lanerossi Vicenza, Napoli and Cesena.

International
Despite his ability and performances at club level, Filippi was never capped for the Italy national football team, and he is considered one of Italy's greatest players to have never played for the national side.

Style of play
A highly recognisable player due to his trademark long haircut, Filippi was a small yet energetic midfielder with a light, slender build, but who was known for his consistency, as well as his outstanding stamina, tireless runs in midfield, and work-rate, which enabled him to cover the pitch effectively. He usually played as a  central or defensive midfielder, where he functioned as a ball-winner, although he also possessed good feet in spite of his playing role.

Management career
Filippi managed Treviso, Pro Gorizia, Luparense, Piovese, Thermal Abano, and Campodarsego.

Honours

Club 

 Lanerossi Vicenza
 Serie B: 1976–77

Individual 

 Guerin d'Oro: 1978, 1979

References

External links
 Roberto Filippo at Calciatori.com. 

Living people
1948 births
Italian footballers
Serie A players
Serie B players
Calcio Padova players
Bologna F.C. 1909 players
Reggina 1914 players
L.R. Vicenza players
S.S.C. Napoli players
Atalanta B.C. players
A.C. Cesena players
Association football midfielders
A.S. Pro Gorizia managers